Japan and the World Economy is a peer-reviewed academic journal that was established in 1989 and is edited by Shin-Ichi Fukuda. It contains articles about Japanese economy, including finance, managerial sciences, agriculture, and economic ties with other countries.

External links 

Economics journals
Quarterly journals
English-language journals
Elsevier academic journals
Publications established in 1988